Debris Inc. was an American doom metal/punk rock band from Chicago, Illinois, active between 2001 and 2008.

Members
Dave Chandler – guitar, vocals (Saint Vitus)
Ron Holzner – bass (Trouble, Place of Skulls, Novembers Doom)
Jimmy Bower – drums (Superjoint Ritual, Eyehategod, Down)

Discography 
Debris Inc. (2005)

References

American doom metal musical groups
Heavy metal musical groups from Illinois
American musical trios